The 39th Virginia Infantry Regiment was an infantry regiment raised in Virginia for service in the Confederate States Army during the American Civil War. It fought mostly in Norfolk and on Virginia's Eastern Shore.

The 39th Virginia was organized during the summer of 1861 with eleven companies: eight infantry, two cavalry, and one artillery. The unit was attached to the Department of Norfolk and served on the Eastern Shore of Virginia. In November it was ordered to evacuate the peninsula but was unable to cross the Chesapeake Bay. Efforts failed to reorganize the regiment, and it disbanded on February 3, 1862. Many of the members were reformed into the 19th Virginia Heavy Artillery (Atkinson's). They served much of the war's remaining years in the batteries north and east of Richmond.  In April, 1865, the unit was part of Lee's retreat to Appomattox.  One of their final engagements was at Saylor's Creek where several members were captured.

Its commanders were Colonel Charles Smith, Lieutenant Colonel Louis C.H. Finney, and Major N.R. Cary.

See also

List of Virginia Civil War units

References

Units and formations of the Confederate States Army from Virginia
1861 establishments in Virginia
Military units and formations established in 1861
1865 disestablishments in Virginia
Military units and formations disestablished in 1865